A vision processing unit (VPU) is (as of 2023) an emerging class of microprocessor; it is a specific type of AI accelerator, designed to accelerate machine vision tasks.

Overview 

Vision processing units are distinct from video processing units (which are specialised for video encoding and decoding) in their suitability for running machine vision algorithms such as CNN (convolutional neural networks), SIFT (Scale-invariant feature transform) and similar.

They may include direct interfaces to take data from cameras (bypassing any off chip buffers), and have a greater emphasis on on-chip dataflow between many parallel execution units with scratchpad memory, like a manycore DSP. But, like video processing units, they may have a focus on low precision fixed point arithmetic for image processing.

Contrast with GPUs 

They are distinct from GPUs, which contain specialised hardware for rasterization and texture mapping (for 3D graphics), and whose memory architecture is optimised for manipulating bitmap images in off-chip memory (reading textures, and modifying frame buffers, with random access patterns). VPUs are optimized for performance per watt, while GPUs mainly focus on absolute performance.

Target markets are robotics, the internet of things, new classes of digital cameras for virtual reality and augmented reality, smart cameras, and integrating machine vision acceleration into smartphones and other mobile devices.

Examples 
 Movidius Myriad X, which is the third-generation vision processing unit in the Myriad VPU line from Intel Corporation.
 Movidius Myriad 2, which finds use in Google Project Tango, Google Clips and DJI Drones
Pixel Visual Core (PVC), which is a fully programmable Image, Vision and AI processor for mobile devices
 Microsoft HoloLens, which includes an accelerator referred to as a Holographic Processing Unit (complementary to its CPU and GPU), aimed at interpreting camera inputs, to accelerate environment tracking & vision for augmented reality applications.
 Eyeriss, a design from MIT intended for running convolutional neural networks.
 NeuFlow, a design by Yann LeCun (implemented in FPGA) for accelerating convolutions, using a dataflow architecture.
 Mobileye EyeQ, by Mobileye
 Programmable Vision Accelerator (PVA), a 7-way VLIW Vision Processor designed by Nvidia.

Similar processors 

Some processors are not described as VPUs, but are equally applicable to machine vision tasks.  These may form a broader category of AI accelerators (to which VPUs may also belong), however as of 2016 there is no consensus on the name:

 IBM TrueNorth, a neuromorphic processor aimed at similar sensor data pattern recognition and intelligence tasks, including video/audio.
 Qualcomm Zeroth Neural processing unit, another entry in the emerging class of sensor/AI oriented chips.

See also 

 Adapteva Epiphany, a Manycore processor with similar emphasis on on-chip dataflow, focussed on 32-bit floating point performance. 
 CELL, a multicore processor with features fairly consistent with vision processing units (SIMD instructions & datatypes suitable for video, and on-chip DMA between scratchpad memories).
 Coprocessor
 Graphics processing unit, also commonly used to run vision algorithms. NVidia's Pascal architecture includes FP16 support, to provide a better precision/cost tradeoff for AI workloads.
 MPSoC
 OpenCL
 OpenVX
 Physics processing unit, a past attempt to complement the CPU and GPU with a high throughput accelerator.
 Tensor processing unit, a chip used internally by Google for accelerating AI calculations.

References

External links
 Eyeriss architecture
 Holographic processing unit
 NeuFlow: A Runtime Reconfigurable Dataflow Processor for Vision 

Microprocessors
AI accelerators
Machine vision